Newcombia perkinsi is a species of air-breathing land snail, a terrestrial pulmonate gastropodmollusk in the family Achatinellidae. This species is endemic to Hawaii, the United States.

References

P
Biota of Molokai
Molluscs of Hawaii
Endemic fauna of Hawaii
Endangered fauna of Hawaii
Gastropods described in 1896
Taxonomy articles created by Polbot